Luís of Brazil may refer to:

 Prince Luiz of Orléans-Braganza (1878–1920), Prince of Brazil
 Prince Luiz of Orléans-Braganza (1938–2022), pretender to the throne of Brazil